This is a list of events from British radio in 1955.

Events
17 April – Opening of Hancock's Half Hour 2nd series on BBC radio. Shortly before it is due to be recorded Tony Hancock walks out of a theatre performance suffering from "nervous exhaustion" and flies to Rome. Harry Secombe is brought in at short notice to replace him in the radio series and stars in the first three episodes, making a guest appearance in the fourth (10 May) when Hancock returns. Andrée Melly joins the regular cast playing a French character.
2 May – Opening of Wrotham transmitting station in Kent, the UK's first VHF/FM transmitters.
22 September – The character Grace Archer dies in the BBC radio serial The Archers; a spoiler for the launch of ITV on the same day.
The Welsh Home Service becomes available on VHF from the Wenvoe transmitting station.

Programme debuts
4 October – Pick of the Pops (1955–Present)
 From Our Own Correspondent (1955–Present)

Continuing radio programmes

1930s
 In Town Tonight (1933–1960)

1940s
 Music While You Work (1940–1967)
 Sunday Half Hour (1940–2018)
 Desert Island Discs (1942–Present)
 Family Favourites (1945–1980)
 Down Your Way (1946–1992)
 Have A Go (1946–1967)
 Housewives' Choice (1946–1967)
 Letter from America (1946–2004)
 Woman's Hour (1946–Present)
 Twenty Questions (1947–1976)
 Any Questions? (1948–Present)
 Mrs Dale's Diary (1948–1969)
 Take It from Here (1948–1960)
 Billy Cotton Band Show (1949–1968)
 A Book at Bedtime (1949–Present)
 Ray's a Laugh (1949–1961)

1950s
 The Archers (1950–Present)
 Educating Archie (1950–1960)
 Listen with Mother (1950–1982)
 The Goon Show (1951–1960)
 Hancock's Half Hour (1954–1959)

Births
 5 January – Jimmy Mulville, producer
January – Dirk Maggs, radio producer
14 March – Felicity Finch, actress and reporter
5 April – Janice Long, born Janice Chegwin, disc jockey (died 2021)
22 May – Dale Winton, broadcast presenter (died 2018)
Approximate date – Christopher Douglas, comedy actor-writer

See also 
 1955 in British music
 1955 in British television
 1955 in the United Kingdom
 List of British films of 1955

References 

 
Years in British radio
Radio